The Greater Indianapolis Conference is an IHSAA-sanctioned conference formed in 2018. The conference consists of charter schools in Indianapolis, including two that were formerly in the Indianapolis Public Schools system. The conference also sponsors football, as Lighthouse-East began football, joining Howe and Manual.  The conference faced drastic changes in its second year, as Lighthouse-East was closed down, leaving the GIC with five members. The league responded by adding three charter schools and two public schools, including another IPS school.

Members

 Indianapolis Lighthouse Charter School South until 2019.

Former Members

References

Education in Indianapolis
Indiana high school athletic conferences
Education in Marion County, Indiana
Public